Barwick in Elmet and Scholes is a civil parish in the metropolitan borough of the City of Leeds, West Yorkshire, England. It contains 23 listed buildings that are recorded in the National Heritage List for England. Of these, three are listed at Grade I, the highest of the three grades, four are at Grade II*, the middle grade, and the others are at Grade II, the lowest grade. The parish contains the villages of Barwick-in-Elmet, Potterton and Scholes, and the surrounding countryside. Part of Bramham Park is in the parish, and in the grounds are listed buildings. The largest house in the parish is Potterton Hall, which is listed together with associated structures. The other listed buildings include a medieval cross base surmounted by a war memorial, a church and its former rectory, other houses, farmhouses and farm buildings, a road bridge, and a milestone.


Key

Buildings

References

Citations

Sources

 

Lists of listed buildings in West Yorkshire